Enrico Verachi (born January 18, 1990, in Nuoro) is an Italian professional football player. Currently, he plays for Serie D club ASD Marina di Ragusa as a midfielder.

Career
He made his Serie A debut for Cagliari Calcio on March 28, 2010, in a game against U.C. Sampdoria.

ASD Marina di Ragusa
In November 2019 it was confirmed, that 29-year old Verachi had joined Serie D club ASD Marina di Ragusa.

References

External links
 

1990 births
Living people
Italian footballers
Serie A players
Serie C players
Serie D players
Cagliari Calcio players
A.S.D. Victor San Marino players
U.S. Siracusa players
Como 1907 players
Savona F.B.C. players
S.S. Ischia Isolaverde players
Nuorese Calcio players
Association football midfielders